Krutovo is a rural locality (a village) in Sergeikhinskoye Rural Settlement, Kameshkovsky District, Vladimir Oblast, Russia. The population was 9 as of 2010.

Geography 
Krutovo is located 23 km west of Kameshkovo (the district's administrative centre) by road. Novosyolka is the nearest rural locality.

References 

Rural localities in Kameshkovsky District